Inocelliidae is a small family of snakeflies containing 8 genera of which one is known only from fossils. They are commonly known as inocelliid snakeflies.  The largest known species is Fibla carpenteri known from fossils found in baltic amber.

Subfamilies and Genera
The following genera are included in BioLib.cz:

Inocelliinae
Authority: Engel, 1995
 Amurinocellia Aspöck & Aspöck, 1973 (Recent)
 Fibla Navás, 1915 (Eocene-Recent; Fossils: Baltic amber, Spain, USA)
 Indianoinocellia Aspöck & Aspöck, 1970
 Inocellia Schneider, 1843 
 Negha Navas, 1916 
 Parainocellia H. Aspöck & U. Aspöck, 1968
 †Paraksenocellia  Makarkin, Archibald, & Jepson, 2019
 Sininocellia Yang, 1985

Fossil taxa
Includes subfamily †Electrinocelliinae Engel, 1995
 †Electrinocellia Engel, 1995 (Eocene; Baltic amber)
 †Succinofibla Aspöck and Aspöck, 2004

References

Raphidioptera
Insect families
Extant Eocene first appearances